Péter Galaschek (born 25 March 1968) is a retired Hungarian football defender.

References

1968 births
Living people
Hungarian footballers
Association football defenders
Vasas SC players
Rákospalotai EAC footballers
Újpest FC players
Pécsi MFC players
Nemzeti Bajnokság I players
Footballers from Budapest